Hygrotus confluens is a species of Dytiscidae native to Europe.

References

Hygrotus
Beetles described in 1787
Beetles of Europe